Kellyn Morris (born 1980) is an Australian actress, and television presenter.

Career
In 2006, Morris began her Children's Television career in Australia by hosting Network Ten's morning pre-school program Puzzle Play along with Liam Nunan and Patrick MacDonald. The show ran until 2013.
In 2007 morris was a regular cast member of the hit network 10 TV show Neighbour's as Harold's love interest. 
In June 2008, Morris was appointed as the female co-host of Network Ten's national cartoon program, Toasted TV. She remained on Toasted TV until 2013. After moving to and working in London for two years, Kellyn returned to Australia to host, report and produce for Network Ten's 'Totally Wild' in 2015. Kellyn also appeared in supporting roles on numerous other programs for Network Ten, including presenting as an 'around the grounds reporter' for One HD telecasts like the Phillip Island MotoGP annually. Morris has auditioned for several US TV programs, and in 2019 she will appear in The 100, Orange is the new black and in the C network's series flash, Arrow and Supergirl. In 2023 Morris will compete in Australian Bellyflop Challenge.

Education
Morris is currently studying to complete a Bachelor of Film and Television.

References

21st-century Australian actresses
Australian television presenters
Living people
1989 births
Australian women television presenters